The Goat's Bridge (Bosnian, Croatian and Serbian: Kozija ćuprija / Козја ћуприја) is a large stone bridge that crosses the Miljacka river to the east of Sarajevo, Bosnia and Herzegovina.

History 
It was built by the Ottomans in the 16th century. It is the only fully preserved bridge from the Ottoman period which still spans the Miljacka River. The bridge, which is made primarily of white hreša (marble), is a harmonious structure with one main arch and two round openings which help support the weight. This stone material is also used to build Bijela Tabija fortress and Visegrad Gate of the nearby Vratnik fortified town.

The oldest written record of this bridge was made by Mula Mustafa Bašeškija, who noted in 1771 that a stone wall was built from Kozija Ćuprija all the way to Alifakovac.

Dariva 
Between Bentbaša and Kozija Ćuprija, there is a place called Dariva. The main attraction is its walkway that stretches for 8 km along what was once the rugged Miljacka Canyon.

References 

Ottoman bridges in Bosnia and Herzegovina
Bridges in Sarajevo
Bridges completed in the 16th century
National Monuments of Bosnia and Herzegovina
Medieval Bosnia and Herzegovina architecture